Frank Lobo (6 January 1910 – 27 September 1992) was a Barbadian cricketer. He played in one first-class match for the Barbados cricket team in 1933/34.

See also
 List of Barbadian representative cricketers

References

External links
 

1910 births
1992 deaths
Barbadian cricketers
Barbados cricketers
People from Saint Michael, Barbados